WJZZ may refer to:

 WJZZ (FM), a radio station (88.1 FM) licensed to serve Montgomery, New York, United States
 WPUT (FM), a radio station (90.1 FM) licensed to serve North Salem, New York, which held the call sign WJZZ from 2009 to 2014
 WDMK, a radio station (105.9) licensed to serve Detroit, Michigan, which held the call sign WJZZ from 1974 to 1996